Joseph Fassbender (Faßbender) (14 April 1903, in Cologne – 5 January 1974, in Cologne) was a German painter and draughtsman.

Life and art
During the 1920s Fassbender was trained in painting by Richard Seewald at the Kölner Werkschulen. Since 1928, he ran his own studio in Cologne. As an artist, he primarily produced abstract paintings.

During the Second World War he was obliged to work as a Wehrmacht cartographer.

Since 1946 he ran a studio at Bornheim near Bonn. In 1947 Fassbender founded at Schloss Alfter near Bornheim, together with Hann Trier, Hubert Berke and some other artists and men of letters, the "Donnerstagsgesellschaft" in order to revive, and promote, modern painting in the Rhineland.

In 1951 he organized an exhibition for his friend, Max Ernst. In 1955, 1959 and 1964, Fassbender participated at the documentas I-III in Kassel.

In 1958 the artist was appointed professor of painting and drawing at the Kunstakademie Düsseldorf, where he retired in 1968.

Fassbender also designed many placards and book jackets.

Awards
 1929 Villa Romana prize
 1955 Großer Kunstpreis der Stadt Köln
 1964 Order of Merit of the Federal Republic of Germany
 1964 Prize for Graphic Art, Venice Biennale

Works 
 "Vihaminazhera" and untitled wall-paintings at the Beethovenhalle in Bonn
 "Coincidentia oppositorum" - wall-paintings in the entrance hall of the Gesamtschule Bonn-Bad Godesberg
 Tapestries for the Staatskanzlei Düsseldorf and the city hall of Cologne
 Design for the paving of the WDR building in Cologne

See also
 List of German painters

References

Further reading
Siegfried Gohr, ed., Joseph Fassbender: Akademie-Galerie - Die Neue Sammlung. Düsseldorf 2009.
Isabel Fechter, "Spuren der Bewegungen einer Seele : Joseph Fassbender zum 100. Geburtstag". In Die Weltkunst, vol. 73, 2003, pp. 378–380.
Alice Trier-Franzen, Das graphische Werk Joseph Fassbenders (1903 - 1974). Alfter 1994.
Wulf Herzogenrath, ed., Joseph Fassbender: Malerei zwischen Figuration und Abstraktion. Kölnischer Kunstverein, Cologne 1988.
Joachim Heusinger von Waldegg, ed., Joseph Fassbender: Ausstellung zum 70. Geburtstag. Bonn 1973. 
Eduard Trier, Joseph Fassbender: XXXII Biennale di Venezia 1964, Padiglione della Germania, Deutscher Pavillon. Cologne 1964. 
Günter Aust, Joseph Fassbender. Recklinghausen 1961. 
Joseph Fassbender. Exh. cat., Kestner-Gesellschaft, Hanover 1961.
Joseph Fassbender. Exh. cat., Stedelijk Museum, Amsterdam 1961.

External links
Artist website
Portal Kunst aus NRW: Rückblick auf die Ausstellung: Joseph Faßbender "Verwandlungen"
Helga Meister, "Joseph Fassbender neu entdeckt." Westdeutsche Zeitung, 17 September 2009.
Schau für Nachkriegs-Künstler Joseph Fassbender Aachener Zeitung, 17 September 2009.
Stadt Brühl: Joseph Fassbender
"Joseph Fassbender", Artnet
Oxford Grove Art: Joseph Fassbender

German draughtsmen
20th-century German painters
20th-century German male artists
German male painters
1903 births
1974 deaths
Artists from Cologne
Commanders Crosses of the Order of Merit of the Federal Republic of Germany
Academic staff of Kunstakademie Düsseldorf